The 2017 EBSA European Under-18 Snooker Championship was an amateur snooker tournament that took place from 6 March to 8 March 2017 in Nicosia, Cyprus. It was the 2nd edition of the EBSA European Under-18 Snooker Championships.

The tournament was won by the 2016 runner-up and 2016 World Under-18 Snooker Champion Jackson Page who defeated the number 8 seed Amir Nardeia 5–3 in the final.

Results

Round 1
Best of 5 frames

References

2017 in snooker
Snooker amateur tournaments
Sport in Nicosia
2017 in Cypriot sport
International sports competitions hosted by Cyprus
EBSA European Under-18 Snooker